Jarak is a village in Serbia. It is situated in the Sremska Mitrovica municipality, Syrmia District, Vojvodina province. The village has a Serb ethnic majority and its population numbering 2,235 people (2002 census).

Name
In Serbian, the village is known as Jarak (Јарак), in Croatian as Jarak, and in Hungarian as Árki. The word "jarak" means "trench" in Serbian.

Historical population

1961: 2,083
1971: 2,296
1981: 2,092
1991: 2,256

See also
List of places in Serbia
List of cities, towns and villages in Vojvodina

References

Slobodan Ćurčić, Broj stanovnika Vojvodine, Novi Sad, 1996.

Populated places in Syrmia
Sremska Mitrovica